Pseudohyaleucerea nigrozonum is a moth in the subfamily Arctiinae. It was described by Schaus in 1905. It is found in French Guiana.

References

Moths described in 1905
Euchromiina